Baldomero Aguinaldo y Baloy (February 27, 1869 – February 4, 1915) was a leader of the Philippine Revolution. He was the first cousin of Emilio Aguinaldo, the first president of the Philippines, as well as the grandfather of Cesar Virata, a former prime minister in the 1980s.

Early life
Baldomero Aguinaldo was born in Cavite el Viejo (now Kawit), Cavite. He was the son of Cipriano Aguinaldo y Jamir and Silveria Baloy. His father was the son of Eugenio Aguinaldo y Kajigas and Maria Jamir.

Education
He studied law at the University of Santo Tomas in Manila and was still a law student during the outbreak of the Philippine Revolution. He obtained a law degree, but failed to take the bar examination. Unable to practice law, he became a farmer.

Career
Aguinaldo organized, along with his cousin Emilio, the Magdalo chapter of the Katipunan in Kawit. He became president of the council. In the early days of hostilities, he always stayed at the side of his cousin Emilio. He fought in several bloody battles. He also led the Magdalo faction to the Katipunan which had its headquarters in Kawit, Cavite.

Aguinaldo's knowledge of the law and administrative procedures made him a valuable asset to the revolutionary government. He was appointed to several cabinet positions, and was a signer of two important documents: The Biak-na-bato Constitution, and the Pact of Biak-na-Bato.

During the Philippine–American War, Aguinaldo fought again, becoming commanding general of the revolutionary forces in the southern Luzon provinces. When hostilities ended in 1901, he retired to private life.

He held many various positions in the Aguinaldo Cabinet as Director of Finance, Secretary of Treasury, and Minister of National Defense. During the American occupation, he became the President of the Philippine Veterans Association.

Personal life
He was married to Doña Petrona Reyes with 2 children: Leonor and Aureliano. Leonor was the mother of former Prime Minister Cesar Virata. Aguinaldo was a member of the Philippine Independent Church (also known as the Aglipayan Church) as he saw independence from the Roman Catholic Church as a source of national pride. He was elected President of the Comite de Caballeros ("Gentlemen's Committee") of the Philippine Independent Church in Kawit. He had initially organized a local lay organization within the IFI in Kawit in 1904 which later became the splinter group Iglesia de la Libertad.

Death
Baldomero suffered from heart failure and rheumatism at the age of 45 in Malate, Manila. Emilio Aguinaldo, Felipe Agoncillo, Mariano Ponce, and Gregorio Aglipay were among those who paid their respects at his wake, which lasted nearly two weeks. On February 21, 1915, a large audience assembled at the Manila North Cemetery for his funeral; numerous groups such as the Guías Nacionales, Batallón escolar del Liceo de Manila, Guerrilleros Filipinos, and newspaper officials were there.

In popular culture
 Portrayed by Bayani Agbayani in the 2012 film, El Presidente.
 Portrayed by Gexter Abad in the 2013 TV series, Katipunan.
 Portrayed by Jan Urbano in the 2014 film, Bonifacio: Ang Unang Pangulo.

References

http://www.geocities.com/sinupan/AguiB.htm

1869 births
1915 deaths
People from Kawit, Cavite
Filipino generals
People of the Philippine–American War
People of the Philippine Revolution
Secretaries of National Defense of the Philippines
Paramilitary Filipinos
University of Santo Tomas alumni
Baldomero
Aguinaldo administration cabinet members
Burials at the Manila North Cemetery
Members of the Philippine Independent Church